Māruti can refer to:

 Maruti (मारुति), a Sanskrit name referring to Hanuman, son of the Hindu wind god, Pawan Dev 
 Maruti Suzuki, a joint sector industry of The Indian Government and Japanese automaker Suzuki Motor Corporation

See also
 
 Marut (disambiguation)
 Maruta (disambiguation)